The Animation Guild, IATSE Local 839 is a professional guild and union of animation artists, writers and technicians. It was formed in 1952. In 2002, the organization changed its name from Motion Picture Screen Cartoonists.

The full name of the organization is The Animation Guild and Affiliated Optical Electronic and Graphic Arts, Local 839 of the International Alliance of Theatrical Stage Employees and Moving Picture Technicians, Artists and Allied Crafts of the United States, its Territories and Canada, American Federation of Labor-Congress of Industrial Organizations/Canadian Labour Congress.

Governance 
The Animation Guild is governed by its membership, which meets every two months. To supervise the Guild's affairs, every three years the membership elects a sixteen-person Executive Board by secret mail ballot. The Executive Board meets every month. As of December 2016, the key executives on the Board are:
 President: Jeanette Moreno King<https://www.imdb.com/name/nm1436651/>
 Vice President: Jack Thomas<https://www.imdb.com/name/nm0003243/?ref_=fn_al_nm_2>
 Business Representative: Steve Kaplan
The Business Representative is the only paid, full-time elected official of the Guild, which also has a paid staff. All other Board members work at studios under the Guild's jurisdiction.

Collective bargaining agreements 
The Animation Guild negotiates and enforces collective bargaining agreements, or CBAs, with companies employing persons under its jurisdiction. These CBAs:
 define terms and conditions of employment;
 set minimum wages, hours and working conditions;
 provide for a grievance procedure, whereby the Guild intervenes on behalf of its members in disputes with their employers;
 specify the payment of contributions to the Motion Picture Industry Pension and Health Plans (MPIPHP), to provide health insurance and a defined benefit pension plan. The MPIPHP is entirely employer-funded, by hourly contributions and by residuals and supplemental market payments.

All of the terms and conditions of Animation Guild CBAs are minimums; that is, any employee working under a CBA has the unrestricted right to negotiate better terms and conditions than those set forth in the CBA. Such better terms and conditions include but are not limited to:
 "overscale" wages;
 sick pay;
 additional vacation time;
 provisions to allow employees to work at home or off-premises.

The text of the Guild's current CBAs and sideletters can be found on their website.

Animation Guild 401(k) Plan 
Although not part of the CBA, the Guild sponsors a multi-employer, employee-funded 401(k) to which virtually all of its employers are signed. The 401(k) was administered by Mass Mutual in the past, but is currently managed by The Vanguard Group.

Jurisdiction 
The Animation Guild's jurisdiction is determined by its parent body, the IATSE, and as defined in its CBA.

Work jurisdiction 
The Guild covers all artistic, creative and technical job categories in the animation process, with the following exceptions:
 Animation camerapersons are under the jurisdiction of IATSE Local 600.
 Track readers and soundpersons are under the jurisdiction of IATSE Local 695.
 Animation editors are under the jurisdiction of the Motion Picture Editors Guild, IATSE Local 700.
 Animation voice actors are covered by the Screen Actors Guild-American Federation of Television and Radio Artists.
 Generally speaking, animation directors of theatrical features are not covered, as they are considered management due to their ability to hire and fire employees, but animation directors in other media such as television are covered.
 Although animation producers, production managers and non-creative support personnel are not covered under the Guild CBA, employers will sometimes sign a so-called "non-affiliate" agreement that allows them to cover them for purposes of health insurance and pension.
 Although most animation writers are under the Animation Guild's jurisdiction, some are covered by the Writers Guild of America West.
 So-called "freelancers" are covered under the CBA if they are working as employees of a signator employer. Bona fide independent contractors are not covered, since they are not employees of the company for which they perform work.

Although the Guild's traditional jurisdiction was limited to those working on animated films, in recent years the Guild has expanded to the point where a significant percentage of its members are employed in motion picture computer graphics. Today, both 2D and 3D artists work under the Guild's jurisdiction, both in animation and live action.

In 2009, the Guild negotiated bargaining terms for streaming television when it was "something of a quirk," leading to a push by some in the animation industry, and the Guild itself, for better working conditions for those in the industry.

Geographical jurisdiction 
All of the Animation Guild's current collective bargaining agreements are with employers in southern California. The IATSE and other IA locals have jurisdiction over animation in other areas of the United States and Canada.

Employers

Animation studios signed with TAG 
As of 2022, the following animation studios were signed to collective bargaining agreements with the Animation Guild:

 Adelaide Productions, Inc.
 Alien Animation, LLC
 Air Raid Productions, LLC
 Animal Head Animation, LLC
 Applause Productions, LLC
 Bird City, LLC
 Doniley, LLC
 Good Dreams, LLC
 LD Productions, LLC
 Odd Planet, LLC 
 Animated Productions, Inc.
 American Animation Institute, Inc.
 Apple Studios LLC
 Bento Box Animation
 Big Indie Pictures, Inc.
 Cartoon Network Studios
 Williams Street Productions, LLC
 Chuck Productions, Inc.
 CMS Productions
 Cranetown Media, LLC
 Disney Television Animation
 ABC Studios
 Katy Mac Session Productions Inc
 Obelisk Productions, Inc.
 Patricks Road Productions II, Inc.
 Rutherford Bench Productions, Inc.
 DreamWorks Animation, LLC
 DreamWorks Animation Television, Inc.
 Eye Animation Productions Inc.
 Fox Animation Los Angeles, Inc.
 CRD Productions, Inc.
 Minim Productions, Inc.
 Muddy Water Entertainment, Inc.
 Watercooler Productions, Inc.
 Fox Sidecar Animation, LLC
 Fox Television Animation, Inc.
 4th Floor Productions, Inc.
 Green Portal Productions
 Hasbro Studios
 My Little Pony G5 Productions LLC
 My Little Pony Productions LLC
 Woodridge Productions LLC
 HB Wink Productions
 Kapital Productions, LLC
 Legendary Pictures Productions, LLC
 Legendary Features Productions US, LLC
 Legendary Television Animation, LLC
 Marvel Film Productions, LLC 
 Marvel Animation Studio LLC
 Reassembled Productions LLC
 Metro-Goldwyn-Mayer Animation Inc.
 Netflix Animation, LLC
 Nickelodeon Animation Studios
 Picrow, Inc.
 Picrow Streaming Inc.
 Picrow Features Inc.
 Pour Animer, LLC
 Robin Red Breast
 Rough Draft Studios
 SBI Media, LLC (Starburns Industries)
 Solar Opposites LLC
 Sony Pictures Animation
 STX Animation
 Toei Doga Productions, LLC
 Tom T Animation/Gang of Seven Animation
 Next Step Productions LLC
 Tomorrow Friends LLC
 Turner 1050 Productions
 Thwip Productions LLC
 Universal City Studios LLC
 Universal Animation Studios, LLC
 Universal Cable Animation LLC
 Viltrumite Pants, LLC
 Walt Disney Animation Studios
 Walt Disney Pictures
 Shawndan Animation, Inc.
 Warner Animation Group
 Warner Bros. Animation
 Warner Specialty Productions Inc.

Payroll companies 
The Guild also signs collective bargaining agreements with payroll companies. Payroll companies perform the payroll and other administrative functions (often including human resources) for small companies and unincorporated animation projects, and serve as the employer of record for purposes of making Guild health insurance, 401(k) plan and pension payments, and processing grievances.  Payroll companies signed to the CBA include:
 Cast & Crew Production Plr Inc.
 EPSG Management Services (Entertainment Partners)
 Payday Inc.
 Quantum Payroll Services, Inc.

Membership requirements 
Membership in the Animation Guild can be acquired in either of two ways:

Membership by employment 
Animation artists, writers and technicians who are hired by employers signed to Guild CBAs will be required to join the Guild after thirty days' employment. The one-time initiation fee consists of two weeks' minimum scale wages for the job category in which the applicant has been hired.

Dues are charged quarterly and are also based upon the scale rate for the job category as of the beginning of the quarter. As of August 2008 the highest dues rate is $101.00.

Membership by organizing 
Animation artists, writers and technicians who are employed by companies that do not have TAG agreements, may become members if and when the company is organized. Potential members may assist the Guild in its organizing efforts by signing a confidential representation card.

After the employer is organized and signed to a collective bargaining agreement, employees often are brought into membership without initiation fees.

NewDeal4Animation 
NewDeal4Animation was a Tweet protest created in November 17 by The Animation Guild, advocating for equal pay between animation writers and live-action writers, also citing the effects of COVID-19 on their jobs. In a February 2021 video campaign featuring various animation writers, the Guild said that animation writers received less than half of live-action writers' pay. Other cited issues included changes in the workflow of studios, such as increased workload, out of proportion with shorter development time from technological advances; and paying animators for large first seasons at a lower rate (pay boosts are given for renewed series), but splitting that season into multiple smaller seasons for viewers. Negotiations for a new contract between TAG and the Alliance of Motion Picture and Television Producers—their last contract expired on October 30, 2021—began in November 2021, and in May 2022, a new contract was agreed to, with retroactive additional wages and special clauses for remote work.

References

Further reading

External links 
 
  blog
 , by: TAG President Emeritus Tom Sito

International Alliance of Theatrical Stage Employees
Trade unions in California
Entertainment industry unions
American animation
Trade unions established in 1952